Tariq Mahmud Ahmad Muhammad al-Sawah is a citizen of Egypt who was held in the United States Guantanamo Bay detention camps, in Cuba, from May 2002 to January 2016.

He was charged with war crimes, but those charges were dismissed on March 1, 2012.
According to the Egypt Independent, formerly secret documents, drafted by Joint Task Force Guantanamo, and published by the whistleblower organization WikiLeaks in 2011, contradicted the charges al-Sawah had faced.

Background

Al-Sawah was one of the few captives who acknowledged having fought in conflicts such as the Bosnian war during the Breakup of Yugoslavia.

Tariq Mahmud Ahmad Muhammad al-Sawah arrived at the Guantanamo detention camps on May 5, 2002, 
and was held there for 5008 days, until January 20, 2016.

The Long War Journal reported that al-Sawah joined the Egyptian Muslim Brotherhood in 1981. They reported that he was rounded up in the large round-up of Muslim Brotherhood members following the assassination of Anwar Sadat. They reported he had invented an early model of shoe-bomb in the summer of 2001 and that he developed new models of magnetic limpet-mines.

However, the FBI found that claims of al Sawah's explosive expertise were the result of novice military interrogators jumping to improper conclusions.

Tom Dale, writing for the Egyptian Independent found that there was a "disregard for both fact and coherence on the part of U.S. interrogators."

It was reported that "much of the information given by Guantanamo detainees was confessed under Pentagon-mandated torture," and in the case of al-Sawah, "several former Guantanamo commanders had indicated that El-Sawah was not a threat and recommended his release."  

The Washington Post reported that al-Sawah and Mohamedou Ould Slahi were held in a separate compound, where they were extended extra privileges, as they had both chosen to cooperate with intelligence officials.

In August 2012, al-Sawah was the last Egyptian captive in Guantanamo.

Al-Sawah was seriously wounded by a cluster bomb, prior to apprehension. He gained over 200 pounds during his first four years of detention.

Official status reviews

Originally the Bush Presidency asserted that captives apprehended in the "war on terror" were not covered by the Geneva Conventions, and could be held indefinitely, without charge, and without an open and transparent review of the justifications for their detention.
In 2004 the United States Supreme Court ruled, in Rasul v. Bush, that Guantanamo captives were entitled to being informed of the allegations justifying their detention, and were entitled to try to refute them.

Office for the Administrative Review of Detained Enemy Combatants

Following the Supreme Court's ruling the Department of Defense set up the Office for the Administrative Review of Detained Enemy Combatants.

Scholars at the Brookings Institution, led by Benjamin Wittes, listed the captives still
held in Guantanamo in December 2008, according to whether their detention was justified by certain
common allegations:

 Tariq Mahmud Ahmad Muhammad al-Sawah was listed as one of the captives who "The military alleges ... are members of Al Qaeda."
 Tariq Mahmud Ahmad Muhammad al-Sawah was listed as one of the captives who "The military alleges ... traveled to Afghanistan for jihad."
 Tariq Mahmud Ahmad Muhammad al-Sawah was listed as one of the captives who "The military alleges ... took military or terrorist training in Afghanistan."
 Tariq Mahmud Ahmad Muhammad al-Sawah was listed as one of the captives who was a foreign fighter.
 Tariq Mahmud Ahmad Muhammad al-Sawah was listed as one of "36 [captives who] openly admit either membership or significant association with Al Qaeda, the Taliban, or some other group the government considers militarily hostile to the United States."
 Tariq Mahmud Ahmad Muhammad al-Sawah was listed as one of the captives who had admitted "fighting on behalf of Al Qaeda or the Taliban."

However, al Sawah has long denied that he was ever a member of Al Qaeda, that he traveled to Afghanistan for jihad, that he took part in terrorist training, that he was hostile towards the United States, or that he fought on behalf of Al-Qaeda.

Habeas corpus petition

Al-Sawah had a writ of habeas corpus filed on his behalf in June 2005.

Formerly secret Joint Task Force Guantanamo assessment

On April 25, 2011, whistleblower organization WikiLeaks published formerly secret assessments drafted by Joint Task Force Guantanamo analysts.
Joint Task Force Guantanamo drafted a fourteen-page assessment of al-Sawah, dated September 30, 2008.
The memo was signed by camp commandant David M. Thomas Jr. and  recommended his "Transfer Out of DOD Control."

Joint Review Task Force

When he assumed office in January 2009 President Barack Obama made a number of promises about the future of Guantanamo.
He promised the use of torture would cease at the camp. He promised to institute a new review system. That new review system was composed of officials from six departments, where the OARDEC reviews were conducted entirely by the Department of Defense. When it reported back, a year later, the Joint Review Task Force classified some individuals as too dangerous to be transferred from Guantanamo, even though there was no evidence to justify laying charges against them. On April 9, 2013, that document was made public after a Freedom of Information Act request.
Tariq Mahmud Ahmad Muhammad al-Sawah was one of the 71 individuals deemed too innocent to charge, but too dangerous to release.
Although Obama promised that those deemed too innocent to charge, but too dangerous to release would start to receive reviews from a Periodic Review Board less than a quarter of men have received a review. Al-Sawah was approved for transfer on February 12, 2015.

Faces charges before a Guantanamo military commission
On December 16, 2008 Carol Rosenberg, writing in the Miami Herald, reported that the Guantanamo military commission prosecutors announced charges had been laid against Tariq al-Sawah.

These charges were later dismissed on March 1, 2012.

Al-Sawah was represented by Major Sean Gleason, an active-duty Judge Advocate.

Health issues

Rosenberg noted that the documents the DoD had published showed wild fluctuations in his body weight.

In March 2013 the Egypt Independent reported that Tariq's lawyers had arranged for Dr. Sondra Crosby, an associate professor of medicine at the Boston University School of Medicine and Public Health, to examine him on two occasions.
A letter from Crosby to camp authorities describes his health as at serious risk, due to his morbid obesity.  Nevertheless, camp authorities decline to offer him any special treatment, or even to release his medical records.

Release and resettlement
Al-Sawah was released in January 2016 after Bosnia and Herzegovina had expressed willingness to accept him.

References

External links
For two detainees who told what they knew, Guantanamo becomes a gilded cage The Washington Post, March 24, 2010
 Who Are the Remaining Prisoners in Guantánamo? Part Two: Captured in Afghanistan (2001) Andy Worthington, September 17, 2010

1957 births
Detainees of the Guantanamo Bay detention camp
Bosnia and Herzegovina extrajudicial prisoners of the United States
Living people
Bagram Theater Internment Facility detainees
People indicted for war crimes